The overhand knot is one of the most fundamental knots, and it forms the basis of many others, including the simple noose, overhand loop, angler's loop, reef knot, fisherman's knot, half hitch, and water knot. The overhand knot is a stopper, especially when used alone, and hence it is very secure, to the point of jamming badly. It should be used if the knot is intended to be permanent. It is often used to prevent the end of a rope from unraveling. An overhand knot becomes a trefoil knot, a true knot in the mathematical sense, by joining the ends. It can also be adjusted, faired, or mis-tied as a half hitch.

Tying

There are a number of ways to tie the Overhand knot.
 Thumb method – create a loop and push the working end through the loop with your thumb.
 Overhand method – create a bight, by twisting the hand over at the wrist and sticking your hand in the hole, pinch the working end with your fingers and pull through the loop.

Heraldry

In heraldry, the overhand knot is known as a "Stafford knot", owing to a representation of it being used first as a heraldic badge by the Earls of Stafford, and later as a general symbol of Staffordshire.

In nature
As a defensive measure, hagfishes, which resemble eels, produce large volumes of thick slime when disturbed. A hagfish can dislodge large quantities of slime on its skin, which it uses to evade predation, by tying its own body into an overhand knot, then sliding the knot from its head down to the tail. This action scrapes the slime off the fish's body. Hagfish also tie their bodies into overhand knots in order to create leverage to rip off chunks of their prey's flesh, but do so "in reverse" (starting at the tail, and sliding the knot towards the head for mechanical advantage).

Knot theory
If the two loose ends of an overhand knot are joined together (without creating additional crossings), this becomes equivalent to the trefoil knot of mathematical knot theory.

In paper-folding

If a flat ribbon or strip is tightly folded into a flattened overhand knot, it assumes a regular pentagonal shape.

See also
 List of knots
 Trefoil knot, the mathematical treatment of the overhand knot
 Double overhand knot
 Slip knot

References

External links